LMD may stand for:
 Laser capture microdissection
Leptomeningeal disease 
 Life Model Decoy, a fictional android in Marvel Comics
 Linux Malware Detect
 Le Monde Diplomatique a periodical of international current affairs publishing in multiple languages.
 LMD (magazine), a Sri Lankan business magazine